Albalate de las Nogueras is a municipality in Cuenca, Castile-La Mancha, Spain. It has a population of 257 as of 2020.

References 

Municipalities in the Province of Cuenca